The Northwind 29 is a Canadian sailboat that was designed by C&C Design and first built in 1969.

Production
The design was built by Paceship Yachts in Mahone Bay, Nova Scotia, Canada, who completed 104 examples between 1969 and 1972, but it is now out of production.

Design

The Northwind 29 is a recreational keelboat, built predominantly of fibreglass, with wood trim. It has a masthead sloop rig, a raked stem, a raised reverse transom, an internally mounted spade-type rudder controlled by a tiller and a fixed stub keel, with a retractable centreboard.

The design displaces  and carries  of ballast.

The production boats were delivered with a factory-fitted Universal Atomic 4 gasoline inboard engine.

Operational history
The boat was at one time supported by an active class club, The Paceship, but the club is currently inactive.

See also
List of sailing boat types

Similar sailboats
Alberg 29
Bayfield 29 
C&C 29
Cal 29
Hunter 290
Island Packet 29
Mirage 29
Prospect 900
Tanzer 29
Thames Marine Mirage 29
Watkins 29

References

External links

Photo of a Northwind 29 showing the production transom and stub keel configuration

Keelboats
1960s sailboat type designs
Sailing yachts
Sailboat type designs by C&C Design
Sailboat types built by Paceship Yachts